Tang Siu Hau (born 24 June 1989), is a Hong Kong female singer who debuted in 2010. She was a top 10 finalist of the Hong Kong edition of the show, The Voice.

Career 
In 2009, she participated in the television singing contest, The Voice and came as the sixth and signed to TVB. In 2014, she participated in The Voice of China (season 3).

In 2015, she  signed to Frenzi Music and in 2016, she signed to Asia Media.

In 2016, she had released her debut extended play, The Strength of Weakness. The lead single, "Elegant" had peaked at the first place at RTHK music station and won the Top Cantopop Songs from Music King Awards.

In 2018, she had released her second extended play, Inner Voice.

In 2019, she had released her third extended play, No Coincidence and won the Artist to Watch Award from KKBOX Hong Kong Music Awards.

Discography

Extended plays 
The Strength of Weakness (2016)
Inner Voice (2018)
No Coincidence (2019)
Obsessions (2019)
Petit Fours (2022)

Concerts/Tours

Headlining concerts

Awards and nominations

References 

21st-century Hong Kong women singers
Living people
Hong Kong television people
Participants in Chinese reality television series
1989 births
Alumni of the Education University of Hong Kong